Anthony Edward Visconti (born April 24, 1944) is an American record producer, musician and singer. Since the late 1960s, he has worked with an array of performers. His first hit single was T. Rex's "Ride a White Swan" in 1970, the first of many hits in collaboration with Marc Bolan. Visconti's lengthiest involvement was with David Bowie: intermittently from the production and arrangement of Bowie's 1968 single "In the Heat of the Morning" / "London Bye Ta-Ta" to his final album Blackstar in 2016, Visconti produced and occasionally performed on many of Bowie's albums. Visconti's work on Blackstar was cited in its Grammy Award for Best Engineered Album, Non-Classical and his production of Angelique Kidjo's Djin Djin was cited in its Grammy Award for Best Contemporary World Music Album.

Early life
Visconti was born in Brooklyn, New York, to parents of Italian descent. He started to play the ukulele when he was five years old, and then learned guitar.  He attended New Utrecht High School. Throughout his teenage years Visconti was involved with both a classical brass band (playing tuba) and a traditional orchestra (playing double bass), as well as playing rock 'n' roll-oriented guitar, valuable experience which served him well in later years. By the age of 15 he focused his efforts playing in local Brooklyn bands.

After leaving school he played guitar in a band called Ricardo & the Latineers in the Catskills; the band also included Artie Butler, later a leading arranger. In 1960 he played his first recording session, and over the next few years became one of the leading guitarists in New York nightclubs. He played in lounge acts including the Ned Harvey band, and the Speedy Garfin Band, before joining a touring version of The Crew-Cuts, where he met his future wife.  As Tony and Siegrid, the pair released two singles; the first, "Long Hair", was a regional hit in New York in 1966, but they could not maintain its success.

Production
Visconti then became in-house producer for his publisher, the Richmond Organization. Through this, he met British producer Denny Cordell in 1968 while he was working as Richmond's in-house music producer. Cordell asked him to assist in recordings for successful jazz vocalist Georgie Fame. Visconti moved to London—in a move that would soon become career-defining.

One of his first production projects in England was with the British outfit Tyrannosaurus Rex (later to become T. Rex) on their debut album My People Were Fair and Had Sky in Their Hair... But Now They're Content to Wear Stars on Their Brows (1968). This began a relationship with T. Rex that would last for their next eight albums, and eleven UK Top Ten singles in a row, commencing with "Ride a White Swan" (1970). One of Visconti's greatest successes was Electric Warrior (1971), the album that made T. Rex frontman Marc Bolan a superstar and cemented Visconti's producing prowess.

More early production work included David Bowie's second album (1969), and for the Welsh group The Iveys (later known as Badfinger). He produced several tracks for the Iveys' first LP Maybe Tomorrow (1969) and Magic Christian Music (1970), released on The Beatles' Apple label.

He produced the first two albums by influential progressive rock band Gentle Giant. Shortly afterwards, Visconti began to work again with David Bowie and, along with guitarist Mick Ronson and drummer John Cambridge, formed and toured with the band The Hype in which he played bass. Although the band name would be very short-lived, most of the line-up persisted and – with Woody Woodmansey replacing Cambridge – would go on to record Bowie's album and single The Man Who Sold the World in 1970. He would further go on to work on Bowie's albums Diamond Dogs (1974), Young Americans (1975), Low (1977), "Heroes" (1977), Lodger (1979), Scary Monsters (And Super Creeps) (1980), Heathen (2002), Reality (2003), The Next Day (2013) and Blackstar (2016).

Visconti scored the orchestral arrangements for Paul McCartney and Wings' 1973 album Band on the Run. He later produced two albums for the Moody Blues, The Other Side of Life (1986), and Sur La Mer (1988).

In 1990, he produced several tracks on the Moody Blues' Keys of the Kingdom album (1991), Luscious Jackson's Electric Honey, Leisure Noise by Gay Dad, Soul Caddy for Cherry Poppin' Daddies and Dawn of Ananda for Annie Haslam. In 1997, Visconti produced the debut album of The Stone Roses member John Squire's new band, The Seahorses, entitled Do It Yourself. In the 2000s Visconti renewed his association with David Bowie, producing the albums Heathen in 2002, and Reality in 2003.

He produced and played bass on a handful of tracks from The Dandy Warhols' 2003 album Welcome to the Monkey House. In 2003 he teamed up with the Finn Brothers (Neil and Tim of Crowded House and Split Enz fame) to record and produce their second collaborative album, eventually released in 2004. In 2004, he produced three songs on the Manic Street Preachers album Lifeblood. In 2005, he collaborated with Copenhagen band Kashmir, whose fifth album, No Balance Palace, featured David Bowie. He has also collaborated as co-writer and producer on the album project by Richard Barone. He worked in Rome and produced the #1 UK album by Morrissey Ringleader of the Tormentors.

His autobiography, Bowie, Bolan and The Brooklyn Boy, co-written with Richard Havers, was published in February 2007 by HarperCollins UK. The book has been translated into French by Jérôme Soligny as Tony Visconti Bowie, Bolan et le Gamin de Brooklyn, published by Tournon.

In 2007 and 2008, Visconti was very active in the studio with Benin singer Angélique Kidjo, producing her Grammy-winning album Djin Djin. Guest artists include Alicia Keys, Peter Gabriel, Joss Stone, Josh Groban and Carlos Santana. He has also produced two albums at Saint Claire Recording Studio in Lexington, Kentucky: The Bright Lights of America by Pittsburgh punk band Anti-Flag and an album by Alejandro Escovedo called Real Animal released in June 2008. He produced the new No. 1 album (in France) by French artist Raphael in Paris and New York. He produced and mixed Kristeen Young album Music for Strippers, Hookers, and the Odd On-Looker, released in 2009 and arranged Fall Out Boy album Folie à Deux. 2010 marked the release of Richard Barone's Visconti-produced Glow album, which includes five songs co-written with Barone and a remake of T. Rex's Girl. He also played bass, guitar, synth, and Stylophone on the album and performed live in concert with Barone on numerous occasions.

Visconti produced the 2013 David Bowie album The Next Day, and remixed and remastered both The Slider anniversary box set and Electric Warrior 40th anniversary boxed set by T. Rex. In 2013, he produced Solar Secrets by Capsula.

In 2014 Visconti produced and arranged several tracks on Marc Almond's album The Dancing Marquis. Almond had wanted to work with Visconti since hearing some of Visconti's earliest production work with T-Rex and David Bowie, stating "It was a dream to work with Tony".

From 2016 to 2022, Tony Visconti was a jury member of the ANCHOR-Award, linked to the Reeperbahn Festival.

Visconti produced Bowie's final album, Blackstar, released on January 8, 2016.

In 2018, Visconti produced Evil Spirits for The Damned, their first album in 10 years. He also produced Merrie Land the new album by The Good, the Bad & the Queen (2018).

In 2019, Visconti produced the song "The Dragon Cries" with Band-Maid vocalists Miku Kobato and Saiki Atsumi. The track was released on Band-Maid's 2019 release Conqueror.

Visconti served as music producer on the 2022 film Moonage Daydream, a documentary about Bowie written, produced, directed and edited by Brett Morgen.

Personal life
After divorcing his first wife Siegrid, Visconti married Welsh folk singer Mary Hopkin in 1971; they divorced in 1981. The pair have two children, musicians Jessica Lee Morgan and Morgan Visconti. In 1989 he married his third wife, May Pang; they had two children before they divorced in 2000. Visconti currently lives with his girlfriend of 20 years, musician Kristeen Young.

Musician
Visconti played bass on David Bowie's 1970 album The Man Who Sold the World. Since 2015 he has toured the UK, Japan and the US with the Bowie cover band  Holy Holy, playing the album in its entirety and other early Bowie classics, along with the album's original drummer Mick Woodmansey and other well known musicians including singer Glenn Gregory and guitarist James Stevenson. The band have followed this up with later shows in which they perform The Rise and Fall of Ziggy Stardust and the Spiders from Mars album.

Visconti Studio
In September 2016, Kingston University opened Visconti Studio, a tape-based recording studio in partnership with Visconti, the British Library and the Science Museum.

Discography

Albums produced

Publications
The Autobiography: Bowie, Bolan and the Brooklyn Boy. New York: HarperCollins, 2007. . With a foreword by Morrissey.

References

External links

Visconti Studio

1944 births
Living people
American people of Italian descent
Record producers from New York (state)
Musicians from Brooklyn
American rock bass guitarists
American male bass guitarists
American music arrangers
American expatriates in the United Kingdom
Glam rock musicians
Grammy Award winners
Guitarists from New York (state)
20th-century American guitarists
New Utrecht High School alumni
The Hype (band) members
20th-century American male musicians
Holy Holy (tribute band) members